Jagannath Puri Temple Chennai is a Hindu temple dedicated to the divine trinity Jagannath, Baladeva and Subhadra in Chennai, India. The temple located in Kannathur off the East Coast Road by the seaside is built in Kalinga architecture reminiscent of the Jagannath Temple, Puri. The temple has shrines dedicated to Shiva, Ganesh, Bimala. The annual Rathyatra is the main festival celebrated.

Location

The shrine is located at Reddy Kuppam Road, Kannathur, off New Mahabalipuram Road (East Coast Road).

The shrine

The temple was consecrated on 26 January 2001. The shrine is a replica of the Jagannath temple at Puri and is built in Oriya style. The temple is built with 22 marble steps leading up to the shrine. The idols of deities at the shrine are made of neem wood, similar to those at the Puri shrine. The shrine is built of black granite originating from Kancheepuram and white marble from Rajasthan. The landscaping around the temple complex covers an area of one acre. The flowers grown in the garden alone are used for the pooja, which is conducted in Oriya style. The priests at the shrine too are from Orissa.

Other sannidhis (sanctum) at the shrine include those of Yoganarasimha, Shiva, Ganesha, Devi Gajalakshmi, and Devi Vimala, in addition to a Navagraha sannidhi (sanctum meant for the nine planets). The entrance to the main shrine has a huge dhwaja sthambha.

The most important festival at the shrine is the rath yatra, which is celebrated on the same day as in Puri. The primary deities of the shrine, namely, Lord Jagannath, Devi Subadra and Lord Balabadra, are taken around the Kannathur village during the occasion. Unlike Puri, the rath is a single one made of stainless steel and decorated with wood and cloth. It is claimed that the shrine is the only temple in the world to have a stainless steel rath for Lord Jagannath.

The temple also has Pata Chitra paintings on the walls and ceilings, similar to Oriya temples, including the depictions of the ten incarnations of Lord Vishnu.

See also
 Religion in Chennai

References

External links

 Official homepage of Lord Jagannath Puri Temple, Chennai

Temples dedicated to Jagannath
Hindu temples in Chennai